Fatal Voyage is the fourth novel by Kathy Reichs starring forensic anthropologist  Temperance Brennan.

Plot
A plane crash in the mountains of North Carolina and an unidentified severed foot found in the vicinity lead Brennan and would-be lover Detective Andrew Ryan to investigate a mysterious cult.

Critical reception
The book entered the Publishers Weekly performance top 10 list in seventh place on. The Publishers Weekly review praised the book's "restraint" and its "riveting plot", Kim Bunce at the Guardian applauded the plot's "complex and evil tapestry". while Michele Hewitson in the New Zealand Herald called it "another big fat forensic thriller".

External links
Kathy Reichs' page on Fatal Voyage

References

2001 American novels
American crime novels
Novels by Kathy Reichs
Novels set in North Carolina
Charles Scribner's Sons books
Heinemann (publisher) books